Elinor Hancock was an American actress who had a successful career on stage before appearing in many silent films. She was photographed by Alfred Witzell. She appeared in Clara Kimball Young films.

Filmography
The Spirit of Romance (1917)
A Kiss for Susie (1917)
The Fair Barbarian (1917)
A Desert Wooing (1918)
A Petticoat Pilot (1918)
Love Me (1918)
Cheating Cheaters (1919)
Little Comrade (1919)
A Midnight Romance (1919)
The Rookie's Return (1920)
The Barbarian (1920)
Out of the Storm (1920)
The Cup of Fury (1920)
The Cave Girl (1921)
 Tiger True (1921)
 The Fighting Lover (1921)
 Not Guilty (1921)
Playing with Fire (1921)
The Golden Gallows (1922)
Forsaking All Others
Come On Over (1922)
Out of Luck (1923)
Cordelia the Magnificent (1923)
Master of His Home
The Splendid Sin
Tokyo Siren 
Not Guilty (1921)
The Fighting Lover (1921)
Forsaking All Others (1934)
The Rage of Paris (1938)

References

American silent film actresses
20th-century American actresses
Year of birth missing
Year of death missing